Mykhailo Mykhailovych Kushnerenko (18 August 1938 – 2 April 2021) was a Ukrainian politician. He served as Governor of Kherson Oblast from 1997 to 1998, was a member of the Supreme Soviet of the Soviet Union and the Supreme Soviet of the Ukrainian Soviet Socialist Republic from 1989 to 1991.

Kushnerenko died of complications from COVID-19 during the COVID-19 pandemic in Ukraine.

References

1938 births
2021 deaths
People from Kherson Oblast
Central Committee of the Communist Party of Ukraine (Soviet Union) members
Communist Party of the Soviet Union members
Members of the Congress of People's Deputies of the Soviet Union
Governors of Kherson Oblast
Recipients of the Order of the Red Banner of Labour
Deaths from the COVID-19 pandemic in Ukraine